The men's 500 meter at the 2015 KNSB Dutch Single Distance Championships took place in Heerenveen at the Thialf ice skating rink on Friday 31 October 2014. Although the tournament was held in 2014 it was  part of the 2014–2015 speed skating season. There were 24 participants.

Result 

Source:

References

Single Distance Championships
2015 Single Distance